Yang Mingming (born 1987) is a Chinese filmmaker. She graduated from National Academy of Chinese Theatre Arts. Female Directors (2012) is one of her significant work.

Early life and education 
Yang began to learn dancing at five and half years old but she gave it up when she was sixteen. She said: “I had a grand appetite, but being a dancer requires you to control your weight. And my family was conventional, they had this concern that it would be better for me to have literacy education.”

As for film, she didn't even think of being a director in the future before she went to college, and she didn't know that the directing major would start to make films at very early term. Directing used to cost her too much energy on negotiating and communicating,  which she thought it might be a wrong major for her to learn it. It was only by her junior year that she began to feel that she was on the right track. There were two things influenced her to become a director: 1. Watching films every day. As it was a part of her daily assignment she gave herself, it worked very well that she found her patience on film, and further the patience of being a director. 2. French director Robert Bresson. There was a time that she spent 40 mins in biking to visit Robert Bresson's Film Exhibition in Beijing. on the way she accidentally met a torrential rain, and since then she interpreted Robert Bresson differently than anybody else. “The rain made my trip sacred.” she said, “It beautifully connected me and Robert Bresson." Robert Bresson's Mouchette (1967) greatly influenced her and later on inspired all of her works. She said: “I couldn’t stop thinking about Mouchette whenever I wrote about women and women’s agony.

Career 
After the college, Yang Mingming didn’t get the resource to shoot a big budget film, but she had to shoot something to become a director. She said: “It takes too much time to persuade someone to invest my film, I rather use the time to make one.”  In 2010, she came up with the idea that making a film with only one camera and two actress. She was one of the actress, and herself alone was the entire production and post-production crew. It turned out that the Female Directors (2012) was a great success. She took the film to attend film festivals all over the country, and she got the attention from her college professor, Yang Chao. Yang Chao and his brother Yang Jing just registered a film company in 2009, he was very interested in investing young directors. Yang Mingming kept working with Yang Chao ever since then. In 2015, Yang Chao invited her to be the editor of Crosscurrent (2016). Before her, the editor was changed twice. Yang Mingming was the right one, and she contributed to the final success of the film. After Crosscurrent, Yang Mingming got to direct her first feature-length film Girls Always Happy (2018), which was supervised by Yang Chao and produced by Yang Jing.

Filmography

Awards and nominations

References

External links 

March 2018 Interview with Radiichina
Short reviews of Female Director on icarusfilms
杨明明 on Douban (In Chinese)

1987 births
Living people
Chinese women film directors
Film directors from Beijing
National Academy of Chinese Theatre Arts alumni